The Sri Suvisuddharamaya Temple is a Buddhist temple which is located in the North-Western province, Manakkulama, in Sri Lanka. The website www.saddha.org has noted: 
 "Over the past ten years, Sri Suvisuddharamaya Temple has become one of the favourite venues for religious study groups, school excursions and community group outings. Sri Suvisuddharamaya offers regular events, such as meditation retreats."
The site has been open to visits from tourists.

References

External links
 Official site - Saddha.org

Buddhist temples in Puttalam District